Formula One, abbreviated to F1, is the highest class of open-wheeled auto racing defined by the Fédération Internationale de l'Automobile (FIA), motorsport's world governing body. The "formula" in the name refers to a set of rules to which all participants and cars must conform. The polesitter is the driver that has qualified for a Grand Prix in pole position, at the front of the starting grid. Out of the 1,081 completed  (as of the ), the driver that has started in first has gone on to win the race 458 times.

Historically, there have been a number of different qualifying systems; previously, each driver was only allowed a single lap to set his qualifying time. Drivers currently have to compete in three rounds before pole position is determined. The first round, known as Q1, is contested by twenty drivers in an 18-minute session, at the end of which the five slowest cars are eliminated. This is followed by Q2, a 15-minute session, where the slowest five are again eliminated. The remaining ten cars contest Q3, the final 12-minute session to determine their places on the grid and who will sit on pole position.

Lewis Hamilton holds the record for the most pole positions, having qualified first on  occasions. Michael Schumacher is second with 68 pole positions. Ayrton Senna is third with 65 poles. Since 2014, the driver with the most pole positions in a season has been awarded the Pole Trophy. The inaugural Pole Trophy was won by Nico Rosberg, while Charles Leclerc is the most recent recipient of the award with 9 poles in 2022.

By driver

By nationality

Most pole positions per season

* season ongoing.

Most pole positions per season by driver

See also
List of Formula One Grand Prix winners
List of Formula One driver records

References

Bibliography

External links
 Formula One official website
 FIA official website

Polesitters